Tom Hayes (born March 26, 1949) is a retired American football coach. He most recently served as the defensive coordinator at Kansas State University. Hayes was the interim head football coach at the University of Kansas for the final three games of the 2001 season.

Head coaching record

Notes

References

1949 births
Living people
American football defensive backs
Cal State Fullerton Titans football coaches
Coe Kohawks football coaches
Iowa Hawkeyes football coaches
Iowa Hawkeyes football players
Kansas Jayhawks football coaches
Kansas State Wildcats football coaches
New Orleans Saints  coaches
Oklahoma Sooners football coaches
Stanford Cardinal football coaches
Texas A&M Aggies football coaches
Tulane Green Wave football coaches
UCLA Bruins football coaches
Washington Redskins  coaches
People from Keokuk, Iowa
Players of American football from Iowa